Giggleswick School is a public school (English private boarding and day school) in Giggleswick, near Settle, North Yorkshire, England.

Early school
In 1499, Giggleswick School was founded on half an acre of land leased by the Prior and Convent of Durham, to James Carr, the chantry priest at the parish Church of St Alkelda, to enclose and build, at his own expense, one 'Gramar Scole'. By 1512 the school consisted of two small, irregular buildings, next to the parish church. The school was run by the chantry priests until Edward VI dissolved the position. The school was saved by the petition of the King's Chaplain, John Nowell, and in 1553 it received its royal charter. The charter granted land and endowed it with the title: The Free Grammar School of King Edward the VI of Giggleswick. There is some evidence that there was a school on the same site from an earlier date. 
Giggleswick has claims to be one of the oldest public schools, although claims vary depending on the criteria used.  In 2012 the school celebrated its 500th anniversary with numerous events throughout the year, including a ball, an outside concert and fireworks display.

Victorian period
The school continued in its original location until 1867, when it moved out of the village centre up the hill to its present location. At this point, a major expansion of the school and its facilities began. Boarding accommodation was added, playing fields were laid out, and new classrooms built.

The only remaining part of the second school, the covered courtyard, was converted into a shooting range, used by the school's Combined Cadet Force contingent and by units of the Territorial Army (Army Reserve).

School chapel
In 1897, work began on the school chapel, a gift from local landowner and school governor Walter Morrison (MP), which is now a grade II* listed structure. The architect, T.G. Jackson designed the building to Morrison's unusual specifications: a Gothic structure with a dome, that fitted into the surrounding landscape as naturally as possible. It was Morrison's wish that the building should be completely fitted and furnished inside, to allow for no unsympathetic alteration in the future.

The interior was filled with expensive fixtures and fittings. The pews were made of imported cypress wood, the floors covered in marble, and the organ was made by Henry Willis & Sons, a leading organ makers at the time. It was rebuilt in 2005 by GO-Organ Builders Ltd. The chapel's dome was covered in copper which developed a distinctive green verdigris colour, reverting to the original bronze colour after restoration in the late 1990s. The interior of the dome was decorated with mosaics depicting angels playing musical instruments, with the four gospel writers at each corner of the base. The altar furniture is made of sterling silver and Brazilian rosewood. It was presented to the school in memory of Sir Douglas Glover, an old boy and school governor.

Modern school
In 1934, the school was enlarged by the addition of a preparatory school, Catteral Hall for pupils aged 7–13, a new boarding house was created from the Georgian Beck House in the village (Style House), and in 1966 another boarding house, Morrison, was opened. In the 1980s the school became co-educational.
In the late 1990s a pre-preparatory school, Mill House for children aged 3–7 was opened in the grounds of Catteral Hall, and more recent expansion at the school has created a library, dining hall, sports facilities and science laboratories and refurbished the boarding accommodation.

In the 2000s, Giggleswick School (senior, 13–18), Catteral Hall (prep, 7–13) and Mill House (pre-prep, 2–7) were reorganised to create Giggleswick Junior School (2–11) and Giggleswick School (11–18) under a unified Giggleswick brand.

Giggleswick is one of only 18 schools to possess a Royal Marine cadet force, which became affiliated with HMS Bulwark in the autumn of 2004.

Pupils from the school (and pupils from Cranleigh School and Charterhouse School) operate the manual scoreboards at the Open Championship golf tournament. These pupils receive recognition on television each year from golf broadcaster Peter Alliss, on both the BBC in the UK and on ESPN and ABC in the United States.

In January 2022 a new headmaster, Sam Hart, replaced outgoing headmaster Mark Turnbull.

Boarding houses
There are four boys' boarding houses:

Morrison, named after Walter Morrison
Nowell, named after John Nowell
Paley, named after William Paley, headmaster at Giggleswick, and father of William Paley
Shute, named after Josias Shute

Nowell, Paley and Shute are located in the main body of the school (called the Hostel), while Morrison, the most recently built is further from the main school campus. As well, Nowell has recently been refurbished to fit the times.

The two girls' houses are:
Carr, named after James Carr
Style, named after George Style

There is a mixed junior boarding house for pupils in years 4–8 which is also the house for day pupils in years 7 & 8, called Catteral House.

1927 eclipse
The grounds of Giggleswick School near the chapel were selected as the official observation post for the 1927 solar eclipse from where Sir Frank Watson Dyson, the Astronomer Royal, had an uninterrupted view of the flaming corona of the sun through the 23 seconds of its total eclipse. In 2014 the school was rebuilding its own observatory.

Notable alumni

For notable alumni, sometimes referred to as Old Giggleswickians, see Category:People educated at Giggleswick School including:

James Agate (1877–1947), diarist and theatre critic
Stefan Allesch-Taylor CBE (b. 1969) financier, serial entrepreneur and philanthropist
General Sir Noel Birch, GBE, KCMG, CB (1865–1939), soldier; aide-de-camp to King George V
Rudolph Anstead (1876–1962), cricketer and botanist/horticulturist
Clarence Blakiston (1864–1943), actor and singer 
Jon Blundy FRS (b. 1961), geologist, Professor of Petrology at University of Bristol
Oliver Bodington (1859–1936), President of the British Chamber of Commerce
James Bowden (1931–2002), England and Great Britain Rugby League international
Major General Sir Duncan Cumming, KBE (1903–1979), Governor of Kordofan Province, Sudan, President of the Royal Geographical Society
Anthony Daniels (b. 1946), actor who played the android C-3PO in the Star Wars films
Charles Darbishire (1875–1925), East Indian Merchant and Liberal MP
Keith Duckworth OBE (1933–2005), engineer, joint founder of Cosworth Engineering
Sarah Fox, operatic soprano
William Gaunt (b. 1937), actor
Sir Douglas Glover TD (1908–1982), Conservative MP
Douglas Hacking, OBE, PC, DL; 1st Lord Hacking (1884–1950), Conservative MP
Sir John Hare (1844–1921), actor/manager of the Garrick Theatre
George Howson (1860–1919), reforming headmaster of Gresham's School
John Saul Howson (1815–1885), theologian
James Jakes (b. 1987), IndyCar & W.E.C. driver
Thomas Kidd (1770–1850), classical scholar
Reverend John Langhorne (1836–1911), educationist; headmaster of the King's School, Rochester
Arnold Leese (1877–1956), British fascist
Sir Henry Maudsley CMG, CBE, KCMG (1835–1918), founder, Maudsley Hospital
Henry Mercer (priest) (1872-1949), Dean of Perth and convicted fraudster
Joe Mycock (1914–2004), England rugby captain
Oswald Nock (1904–1994), railway historian.
William Paley (1743–1805), theologian (& son of the Headmaster of 1744–1799)
Major Gustav Renwick (1883–1956), industrialist; MP
Nigel Roebuck (b. 1946), journalist
Charles Rycroft (1901–1998), businessman, philanthropist
Lt-Col Harry Norton Schofield V.C. (1865–1931), soldier
Tom Skeffington-Lodge (1905–1994), Labour MP
Ian William Murison Smith  (1937—2016), Professor of Chemistry at the University of Birmingham
Sir Matthew Smith (1879–1959), artist
John Sykes (b. 1956), Conservative MP for Scarborough (1992–97)
Sir Matthew William Thompson, Bt. (1820–1891), Liberal MP, Mayor of Bradford; Chairman of the Midland Railway, etc.
Richard Whiteley, (1943–2005), journalist and television presenter (Countdown and Calendar)
Gary Wolstenholme MBE (b. 1960), golfer
Sir Robert Wynne-Edwards CBE, DSO, MC& Bar (1897–1974), British Army officer; civil engineer

John Flint (b. 1968), Group CEO of HSBC
Charles Tweedale (1865–1944), minister and spiritualist

Headmasters

1499–1518 James Carr, Founder of the Rood Chantry
1548–1560 Richard Carr, Incumbent of the Rood Chantry
1615–1619 Christopher Shute, Vicar of Giggleswick, 1576–1626
1619–1641 Robert Dockray, Vicar of Giggleswick, 1632–1641
1642–1647 Rowland Lucas
1648–1656 William Walker
1656-1656 William Bradley (Temporary)
1656–1684 William Briggs
1684-1684 John Parkinson
1685–1712 John Armitstead
1712–1744 John Carr
1744–1799 William Paley (& father of the namesake alumnus theologian)
1800–1844 Rowland Ingram
1846–1858 George Ash Butterton
1858–1866 John Richard Blakiston
1866–1867 Thomas Bramley (Provisional)
1867–1869 Michael Forster (Provisional)
1869–1904 George Style
1904–1910 William Wyamar Vaughan
1910–1931 Robert Noel Douglas
1931–1955 E. H. Partridge
1956–1960 Niale Shane Trevor Benson
1961–1970 Owen John Tressider Rowe
1970–1978 Richard Creed Meredith
1978–1986 Ian Watson
1986–1993 Peter Hobson
1993–2001 Anthony Millard
2001–2014 Geoffrey Boult
2014–2022 Mark Turnbull
2022- Sam Hart (from January 2022)

Notable former masters

David Chapman (scientist), FRS, Physical Chemist.
Rev. Robert Noel Douglas played cricket for Surrey and Middlesex.
Ronald Eyre, theatre director, writer and actor.
Russell Harty, a BBC2 chat show host in the 1980s from Blackburn, taught English at the school, notably to Richard Whiteley.
John Langhorne (senior) was mathematics and writing master for thirty years, leaving in about 1859.
William Wyamar Vaughan. Headmaster, a position he later held at Wellington and Rugby schools.
David E. W. Morgan (Modern Languages and Careers for 38 years).
Charles Francis Mott became Director of Education at Liverpool.
Allegedly the Yorkshire Three Peaks walk was invented in July 1887 by two masters at the school: D. R. Smith and J. R. Wynne-Edwards (father of Sir Robert Wynne-Edwards – see OG's above).

References

Sources

External links

Educational institutions established in the 15th century
Private schools in North Yorkshire
Boarding schools in North Yorkshire
1499 establishments in England
Member schools of the Headmasters' and Headmistresses' Conference
Paley, Austin and Paley buildings
Schools with a royal charter